Deloraine—Glenwood is a former provincial electoral division in Manitoba, Canada.

The constituency was created for the 1949 provincial election, by a merger of the Deloraine and Glenwood constituencies.  It was eliminated by redistribution in the 1958 election.

Provincial representatives

Former provincial electoral districts of Manitoba